The Secretary of Economic Development and Commerce of Puerto Rico heads the Puerto Rico Department of Economic Development and Commerce and is the chief economist of the government of Puerto Rico. The Secretary is responsible for the economic development of Puerto Rico and all its commerce related matters.

References

External links
 ddec.pr.gov - Official site of the Department of Economic Development and Commerce

Council of Secretaries of Puerto Rico